Brévillers is a commune in the Pas-de-Calais department in the Hauts-de-France region in northern France.

Geography
Brévillers is a village situated some 15 miles (24 km) southeast of Montreuil-sur-Mer on the D135 road.

Population

See also
Communes of the Pas-de-Calais department

References

Communes of Pas-de-Calais
Artois